The Sailors' Revolt was a conflict between the Brazilian Navy authorities and the Association of Sailors and Marines of Brazil (AMFNB) from March 25 to 27, 1964, taking place in Rio de Janeiro at the Sindicato dos Metalúrgicos, Arsenal de Marinha, and Armada ships. Its outcome, negotiated by João Goulart's government, outraged the perpetrators of the coup d'état a few days later, and was thus one of its immediate antecedents. 

It was a class association for a poor category, with difficult working conditions, deprived of rights such as voting and marriage, and marked by social difference in relation to the officers. Founded in 1962, its president in 1964 was the sailor José Anselmo dos Santos, known as "Corporal Anselmo". She encountered hostility from Navy officers around the issue of military indiscipline. Her politicization was not tolerated, unlike the political activities of the officerate.

The Association's two-year anniversary, on the 25th, was celebrated at the Metalworkers Union. Upon receiving news of the arrest of directors for statements made on the 20th, those present decided to remain in assembly until the fulfillment of a series of demands. The Minister of the Navy, decreed strict readiness, which required the presence of the sailors in their units, but they disobeyed. This disobedience did not constitute an armed movement. On the 26th, the minister wanted to invade the Union with marines reinforced by the Army. The commander of the marines, Admiral , was exonerated for his refusal to attack. Subsequently, the first attempt failed as some marines joined the opponents, while the second operation was cancelled to allow the president to negotiate. By the next day the revolt spread to ships, and sailors were shot at the Navy Arsenal. The left was generally in favor of the insurgents, while the officerate was against. Goulart ended the confrontation by giving amnesty to the sailors and appointing  to the Ministry of the Navy. Together with his appearance on the 30th at the meeting at Automóvel Clube, this was harshly criticized by the opposition and seen by the officers as connivance with the breakdown of military discipline, thus strengthening the support base for the military coup that overthrew him at the end of the month.

The revolt is often accused of being the work of agents provocateurs (especially "Corporal Anselmo") in the service of the coup plotters, which has been contested by more recent historians.

Background

The Condition of Sailors

In Brazil, the first half of the 1960s was a period of great mobilization of groups such as "students, unionists, politicians, artists, organized peasants, communists [and] Catholic youth". As part of this social agitation and linked to the other forces, movements emerged among the lower ranks of the Armed Forces, such as sergeants, corporals and soldiers. They were typically leftist, with nationalist and reformist ideology. They organized themselves into class associations, among them the Brazilian Sailors and Marines Association, founded on March 25, 1962 by sailors and marines, up to the rank of corporal. The Brazilianist Thomas Skidmore characterizes it as a union.

The reason for its foundation was the social difference between officers and enlisted men in the Brazilian Navy. Historically this institution had an officer corps with an aristocratic character, while the initial graduates were mobilized among the poor, especially pardos and blacks. The harshness of discipline motivated the "Revolta da Chibata", in 1910. Since then, punishments were not as rigorous, but the working and eating conditions on the ships were terrible, and restrictions remained, as in the case of marriage: sailors, soldiers, and corporals could only marry after years of service and with the permission of officers. They were not allowed to wear civilian clothes outside the barracks, vote or run for elections. Officers could register disciplinary infractions for arbitrary reasons. Corporals were very unhappy with the career plan, which only allowed two attempts at the sergeant qualification exam. Sergeants had much higher pay than corporals.

Both volunteers and conscripts served as enlisted men in the Navy. Most came from poor families, with relatives in the countryside, from the North and Northeast of the country. They served in large numbers in Rio de Janeiro, where most of the ships were. There, they were without family support and unable to marry. During vacations, they could not afford to visit their hometown and looked for temporary jobs. They lived in poor neighborhoods and many were involved with drugs, prostitutes (the "low-life") and petty crime. The stereotype of the sailor was that of a "stray individual of dubious morality, brothel-goer and violent, a drug addict and alcoholic". Testimonials from Association members reveal frustration of expectations with the career and the feeling that the Navy had modern technology but anachronistic social organization.

AMFNB Development
The sailors' movement was initially disconnected from the leftist movements. Corporal João Barbosa de Almeida, the first president, had a conciliatory attitude with the officers, trying to avoid confrontation and radicalization. A faction of sailors who served on board wanted a more political and militant entity and criticized Barbosa de Almeida's moderation. In April 1963, they supported the election of Sailor 1st Class José Anselmo dos Santos, erroneously known as "Corporal Anselmo." He is recognized among the left and the military as a more militant leader, but sources from the sailors reveal that the most militant was not Anselmo, but vice-president Marcos Antônio da Silva Lima. Marcos Antônio had a leadership position among the sailors and maintained contact with other civilian and military entities.

Of the seven purposes listed in the bylaws of the Association, five were welfare purposes. It provided "medical and legal assistance, development of educational incentive projects with partnerships that provided access to classrooms, courses in basic etiquette, English courses, recreational activities (dances, soccer and city tours), and help to those who wished to abandon addictions such as gambling and alcoholism", in addition to lodging for those who lost their transportation. This welfare activity filled the gap left by the Navy's social assistance, "considered almost non-existent". The Association also published the newspaper A Tribuna do Mar.

AMFNB was from the beginning viewed with suspicion by officials. This privilege was granted to less politicized class associations, but not to possible sources of trouble like AMFNB. The naval authorities demanded the modification of the statute, making it purely apolitical, and did not accept the demands of the sailors. According to Justice Minister , Sílvio Mota showed him studies proving the viability of the claims ("marriage, wearing plain clothes off duty, salary improvement, recognition of the Association's statutes with minor modifications"), and their compliance had already been decided. However, it was not implemented.

Conflicts with authorities

As they saw no solution from the naval authorities, the Association's sailors sought the support of the federal government and social movements. In 1964, they became radicalized. The approach was mutual, as the Association grew in relevance and attracted interest from both enemies and allies. It appeared in the press and, according to Anselmo, reached 15 thousand members, of which a third were contributors. This, however, pushed the AMFNB further away from the Admiralty Council. The officers in general, with a few exceptions of government officials such as Admiral Cândido Aragão, commander of the Marine Corps, did not accept the recognition of the Association, nor did they allow their members to participate in the entity's activities.

The sailors came closer to the sergeants' movement, whose concern of the moment was the legal impediments to the candidacies they launched in the 1962 general elections. In September 1963, sergeants from the Air Force and Navy launched military operations in Brasilia as a reaction to a Supreme Court decision reiterating the ineligibility of sergeants. The AMFNB was not responsible for the revolt, but 72 of its members (out of 270 participating Marine enlisted men) were involved and its board of directors favored the insurgents. With the defeat of the sergeants in Brasilia, the press criticized the sergeants' movements and the military authorities began to persecute them.

The concern was the breakdown of the military hierarchy. Sailors "followed the example" of officers who also attempted to undermine the hierarchy to oppose the government, but these political disagreements were only treated as indiscipline and a breach of hierarchy when they came from the enlisted men. Unruliness, also relevant, was in fact used by the AMFNB as a bargaining tool. As sailor Raul Duarte wrote in "A Tribuna do Mar" in February 1964, the granting of the demands was necessary "in order to safeguard discipline and military hierarchy". 

The Minister of the Navy was under pressure from the government to keep the Association, and from the Admiralty Council to close it. However, it would not be simple to close the Association with thousands of sailors; the political effect would be dramatic, and it was a legal entity. The minister feared that if he ordered it closed, this would be challenged in the courts and it would be reopened by a writ of security. The sailors, in turn, were willing to make some concessions to reach an agreement, and rewrote the parts of the statute that bothered their superiors.

The sailors and marines then gathered at the Bankers Union, where they harshly criticized the Minister of the Navy and demanded his resignation. In his place, they wanted former minister . The minister responded with successive arrests of directors of the Association. Three of them - Antônio Duarte dos Santos, José Anselmo dos Santos, and Marcos Antônio da Silva Lima - stayed hidden so that they could participate in the entity's anniversary.

While the crisis was unfolding, President Goulart traveled to São Borja, in Rio Grande do Sul, to spend the Holy Week.

Revolt

The Association's Anniversary

The celebration of the Association's two years, on March 25, had been announced since January. It was scheduled for the Metalworkers' Union, the "Palácio de Aço," at 7:00 pm. The President of Brazil was invited, but did not attend, advised by the Minister of the Navy. Most historians record that the event was banned by the Navy, but Minister Mota never claimed to have made such a ban in his 1964 testimony. He challenged the meeting on other legal grounds, such as the prohibition on public demonstration on internal and political issues. The arrest warrants were for the events of the 20th. The anniversary itself was legal: AMFNB was a civilian registered entity, the sailors were off duty, and the celebration wasn't happening in a military office.

Absent were the president, Minister Jurema and Admiral Aragão. A notable presence was that of João Cândido, leader of the Chibata Revolt, who received a pension from the Association. At age 84, he was photographed by Ultima Hora with the caption "Revolt of 1910 present in 64," emphasizing the connection between the two generations of sailors. However, the "Sea Dragon", as he was known, disagreed with the younger sailors because of his involvement in issues outside the naval sphere; "A sailor's revolt only works at sea". "A sailor should be taking ship, because that's where he knows how to move, and not going to a union, exposing himself to the action of the enemy, who could have even bombed the whole thing."

More than 1,000 or 1.600 seamen. In addition to sailors and marines, there were soldiers from other corporations, such as the Guanabara Military Police and the Brazilian Air Force, and civilians, including deputies, union leaders, and journalists.  notes how "the unity of the left had been reestablished": leading figures from various sectors, such as the Communist Party, the General Workers Command, and the Women's League, attended and spoke. , from the CGT, said he could stop Brazil. Deputy Max da Costa Santos represented the Brizolistas.

The sailors approved the creation of a General Union of Military Workers, unifying the soldiers' associations, and decided to send the minister proposals for "the end of punishments and the release of all prisoners, recognition of the Association, humanization of the Navy, improvement of food in ships and barracks, and the presentation and punishment of torturers".

"Corporal Anselmo," known for his oratory skills, made a very political speech, speaking of "latifundium," "imperialism," "basic reforms," and "exploited". His rhetoric was fully aligned with the left of the time, and his agendas were compatible with those of the CGT, União Nacional dos Estudantes (UNE), and Frente Parlamentar Nacionalista. The concepts were not unheard of and revealed a closeness to Brizolism. Communist Carlos Marighella collaborated in the writing of the text, as Anselmo and Antônio Duarte report. The speech was addressed to the President of Brazil, declaring himself in favor of his reforms, and sought his support by emphasizing that the sailors belonged to the "popular classes".

Anselmo characterized AMFNB as a response to discrimination and defended it from being labeled a "subversive entity". Rebutting this accusation, he affirmed that those who "try to subvert the order are the allies of the occult forces, who led one president to suicide, another to resign, and tried to prevent the inauguration of Jango, and now prevent the Base Reforms from taking place". He then associated the present situation with the Revolta da Chibata. In the military field, he said he had the support of soldiers in the Army, Air Force, Military Police and Fire Department. He clashed with the officialdom when he reported the expulsion of the director of the Association and the prohibition of listening to the rally on ships. To the Congress, he demanded that it accept land reform without prior cash compensation and full voting rights for the military. With the Navy, he wanted reform of the Disciplinary Regulation, recognition of the AMFNB, amnesty for the Brasília rebels, the annulment of disciplinary faults and stability for corporals, sailors and marines.

The permanence in the Metalworkers Union

The anniversary began in a festive mood, but turned into an uproar with the news of the arrests. Those present decided, in solidarity, to report to the brig on Monday the 30th. But the sailor Octacílio dos Anjos Santos ("Tatá") took the floor and suggested that they remain there, remembering that many lived on board. Corporal Cláudio Ribeiro raised the tone, proposing that the commemoration should become a permanent assembly to obtain recognition of the Association by the Navy. These two speeches were exalted and of great importance. 

The Minister of the Navy heard at 02:30 in the morning, as early as the 26th, the sailors' idea to report arrested on Monday. His response was to decree strict readiness. In this way, the sailors were obliged to report to their military organizations, or they would be committing insubordination. At dawn Admiral Aragão went to the Union to personally transmit this order. He returned with the sailors' conditions - the recognition of the AMFNB and the cancellation of the punishments. The minister did not accept and prepared a military response. The sailors, for their part, would remain on watch as long as their demands were not met. Thus, the conflict was drawn. The sailors did not use weapons to make their demands.

In a note, the AMFNB defined the situation as "an epic that will culminate in reforms of our archaic regulations," while for the Navy, a "minority of the military, about 600 men, between sailors and marines, have been since last night in an attitude of frank indiscipline." The communiqué from the naval authorities also stated that the Navy Minister supported President Goulart's reforms and that the improvement of the sailors' conditions was already underway.

A Navy helicopter and a yellow plane flew over the Union. Curious family members and girlfriends brought supplies and cigarettes. The emotion inside was one of distress, with the sailors feeling defensive. Statements by Anselmo and Antônio Duarte also describe a loss of control; Duarte points, in particular, to "Tatá's" speech as destabilizing. On the other hand, in making its demands, the movement was not on the defensive.

The left in general came out in favor of the sailors, even with internal objections that the infraction of discipline was serious and would serve as a pretext for a right-wing coup. Sympathy for the cause of the rebels was strong. For the UNE, "only the reaction feels threatened by the sailors' movement". For the Communist Party newspaper Novos Rumos, only "the enemies of the homeland, the gorillas with or without a uniform" were against the sailors. Panfleto, linked to Leonel Brizola, announced: "The feudal regime in the Navy will end". The CGT threatened a general strike if the sailors were repressed and assumed an arbitrator role.

Legalistic Offensives

Admiral Aragão was ordered to attack the sailors, but he refused and resigned. His subcommander, Admiral Washington Frazão Braga, did the same. Only Admiral Luiz Phelippe Sinay agreed to command the operation. He commanded the Marine Division Core.

The officialdom demanded that the sailors leave, "dead or alive." The Marine Corps Police Company, deployed from Ilha das Cobras, was in charge of the invasion, scheduled for 09:15. 90 marines came in five buses. From inside the Union, the sailors incited the marines and sang the National Anthem. Private Raimundo Nonato Barbosa, disobeying his orders, abandoned his helmet, ammunition, and INA machine gun and joined the sailors. 25 of his comrades repeated the gesture, to the euphoria of the sailors and the amazement of the commanders. The rest of the company had to retreat.

At the Navy Ministry, indignant admirals demanded that Minister Mota assert his authority. A new invasion was planned, this time with the Riachuelo Battalion, based on Ilha do Governador. Commanded by Frigate captain Helio Migueles Leão, it arrived at 4:00 pm. A platoon received tear gas. However, at 6:00 pm Admiral Sinay received the order to withdraw the troops: nothing would be done without the order of the president, who was returning from São Borja. Negotiations remained, and continued throughout the day.

The Army had a marginal participation in the containment of the insubordinates. The disciplinary situation in the Land Force was better, and its soldiers did not join the revolt. The support was requested by the Navy Minister to the Ministry of War and included twelve tanks and 500 soldiers of the Mechanized Reconnaissance Regiment and the 1st Army Police Battalion, the latter with the field presence of Colonel Domingos Ventura. Participation was requested for both offensives, and by the afternoon the entire block was closed by the Army. However, the official position of the War Ministry was that the problem "at present, is restricted to the purview of the Navy Ministry."

Spreading to ships

On the morning of the 27th, a large group of sailors left their boats and went through the Navy Arsenal to join the others in the Union. On the way, they fell into an ambush: officers and marines posted in the buildings, among them that of the Navy Ministry, opened fire, under the command of Admiral Arnoldo Hasselmann Fairbairn. Captain of Frigate Rafael de Azevedo Branco advanced against them. Some fell in the water, others reacted and most of them retreated to their ships. Of those who swam, two made it to the Union. The balance was eight arrests, one dead (according to Jornal do Brasil) and several people wounded, treated, then, at the Navy hospital. Conflicts between sailors in favor of the revolt and officers opposed to it spread throughout the ships. There was insubordination, sabotage of ship components, shooting, and falling into the water. This was recorded on the cruiser Tamandaré, the destroyer Pernambuco, the ship José Bonifácio and the ocean-going vessel Bauru. Sailors from the aircraft carrier Minas Gerais participated in the events at the Navy Arsenal. However, despite the tension, the officers believed that most of the ships were under their control.

In counterpoint to the sailors' movement, a movement of officers arose. They also demanded the punishment of Admiral Aragão.

Ministerial change and amnesty

The president landed in Rio de Janeiro at 1:00 am on the 27th. Half an hour later, he met at the Palácio Laranjeiras with the heads of the Civil and Military Houses and the military ministers. General Genaro Bontempo was replacing War Minister , who was hospitalized. The subject was the Navy Minister's request for exoneration. The Admiralty Council did not want to accept this resignation, but Goulart confirmed it. By this time the AMFNB had already expressed its demand that a new Minister of the Navy be appointed.

Sílvio Mota's successor was Admiral Paulo Mário da Cunha Rodrigues, "president of the Maritime Court, a man of the left and trusted by the CGT". Jornal do Brasil reported that his name "was chosen from a triple list presented by the Executive Committee of the CGT," which was acting with permission granted by the AMFNB. Hércules Côrrea, of the CGT, confirms that the name was presented by his organization. Dante Pelacani, CGT emissary inside the Union, reports that Paulo Mário's name came from the sailors. The two other names on the list were Admirals Suzano and José Luiz de Araújo Goyano. After taking over, Paulo Mário nominated Suzano to the Navy General Staff and restored Admiral Aragão's command in the Marine Corps. As negotiations continued, on the 27th, the Army's Floriano Regiment, kept the Metalworkers Union surrounded.

Goulart wanted a negotiated outcome. The CGT represented the sailors to the president. The solution was to drive the sailors to Army installations, where they would be free of retaliation from the Navy officers, and their amnesty. The CGT emissaries managed to convince most of the sailors, although "Corporal Anselmo" was still reticent.

The origin of amnesty is a controversy. Historiography accepts that it came from Goulart. In the Navy document "Aspectos dos Acontecimentos Político-Militares de 25 de Março a 1º de Abril de 1964", without authorship, it is stated, however, that the decision was made by the minister Paulo Mário, with carte blanche from the president, who until then had a commitment with the previous minister to punish the insurgents. This version is also corroborated in testimony from the minister himself, according to whom he obtained permission for the amnesty after arguing that the admirals also had to be punished.

The sailors were taken from the Union in Army trucks and detained at the Guards Battalion, in São Cristóvão, for three hours. As of 5:30 pm they were released. On the way back, some stopped at the Candelária Church. It was Good Friday, and they prayed for those affected at the Navy Arsenal. As they were heading toward the Ministry of the Navy, Minister Paulo Mário sent Admirals Aragão and Suzano to advise the sailors not to continue. However, they were lifted by the shoulders and carried amidst the euphoria. They passed the Ministry of War, startling the Army officers who silently watched the march.

Consequences

Political repercussions

The sailors imagined themselves victorious and already saw on the horizon the granting of their demands. For the lefts in general, there could be the appearance of victory. For President Goulart, the result would prove negative, as the focus of political debate shifted from the reforms he advocated to military discipline, and his response to the revolt was considered tolerant of indiscipline. Among the newspapers, Ultima Hora treated the solution as the restoration of order, but  and Correio da Manhã criticized the president for not enforcing the principle of authority and denounced the disintegration caused by indiscipline. The press in general pointed to Goulart as responsible for the breakdown of hierarchy and discipline. The repercussion was international: in France, La Croix, Le Figaro, and France-Soir saw the revolt as a serious event.

Detail by detail, the outcome offended the officers and especially humiliated those in the Navy: the choice of a new minister under the influence of the unionists, the detention of the sailors in Army, not Navy, facilities, and the provocative march with the admirals on their shoulders. Amnesty was more offensive than the "Corporal Anselmo" speech itself. The sergeants' revolt of the previous year, although serious, did not have such repercussions, because those responsible were punished. The Navy officers, after watching it unfold in silence, published a manifesto at the Naval Club on the 29th. The document characterizes the "mutinied sailors" as an "insignificant minority"; however, they did not receive the "due disciplinary punishment" and on top of that were able to overthrow the Minister of the Navy and appoint his replacement. This was a "blow struck against discipline in the Navy" and a threat to the country's institutions as a whole. Finally, the officers declared themselves willing to "resist by all means in our power the attempts to communize the country." The next day, the Army officers at the Military Club expressed solidarity with the Navy.

According to the columnist Carlos Castelo Branco, the left-wingers already compared what happened to "an action of the Kronstadt sailors in support of the Petrograd Soviet line", that is, to the Russian Revolution of 1917.  remembers that, during the revolt, the climate among the left was exalted; some "already saw the Odessa stairs, from Eisenstein's film", events of the Russian Revolution of 1905. Tribuna da Imprensa also saw parallels with Russian history, as well as anti-communists in general; with exalted spirits, they had an exaggerated view that this could be the "harbinger of the Bolshevik revolution".

Relation with the coup d'état
In the Navy, tension continued after the amnesty. Some officers did not allow the sailors to board their ships. For the government, the conservative officers in the naval force were demoralized and would not be a threat. Until the 31st, the AMFNB kept the officers cornered. They even controlled the armament, prevented the ships from leaving, and maintained contact with the legalist officers. An extreme group of admirals plotted the capture of the Navy Ministry, but was repulsed by the conspiratorial generals, for whom the Navy officers did not control their ships and could do nothing but publish manifestos. Instead, they were waiting for General Olímpio Mourão Filho's offensive from Minas Gerais.

The precipitation of the conspiracy against the president became a question of time, and in a few days it emerged in a coup d'état. Its perpetrators unanimously pointed, in statements, to the disintegration of the Armed Forces, with the breakdown of hierarchy and discipline, as its motivation. Records of officers of the Military Police of Minas Gerais, a participant in this operation, have the same condemnation of the events in Guanabara. The legalist military, even those favorable to the president's causes, shared this concern, which diminished their willingness to fight the coup. The president felt supported by his military apparatus, and the conquest of the legalists' camp was fundamental to the conspirators' victory: according to them, if Goulart had shown toughness with indiscipline, the correlation of forces would have been favorable to his permanence in power. The military unit was momentarily strengthened, which allowed the coup to take place.

Avelino Capitani, one of the directors who was in prison during the revolt, interprets it as not an antecedent to the coup, but an anticipated response, because the Association was already observing what the coup plotters were doing.

During the coup, AMFNB members were willing to fight on behalf of the government under Admiral Aragão. Some occupied the headquarters of pro-coup newspapers on his orders. Anselmo and the other directors also acted on their own initiative, collecting weapons and planning their military action together with UNE students, unionists, the Peasant Leagues and others. These efforts did not alter the course of the coup, nor did they prevent its success.

Fate of those involved
Soon after the coup, the new regime began a political "cleansing", and the participants of the revolt, as the center of attention of the previous days, were its first targets. For the dictatorship this set an example to the dissidents, and for the Navy, it was a question of prestige. The Naval Force, due to the great politicization of its bases, was the corporation in which the "cleaning" process was strongest. On April 2, CENIMAR officers began the retaliation. Augusto Rademaker, the new Minister of the Navy, expelled the members of the AMFNB, and on November 23 it was dissolved. The  to investigate the events at the Metalworkers Union had 1,123 people indicted. The arrests and political persecution were done through the ordinary disciplinary legislation, not the Institutional Acts, as occurred with the officers.

Some of the insurgents joined revolutionary organizations and participated in their armed struggle. Among them, Anselmo worked as a double agent, allowing the execution of other militants in the early 1970s. With his betrayal, he became the target of the militants' frustration and hatred.

In the 1970s, when amnesty was under debate, the regime's hardliners wanted to limit its scope, including for enlisted men. The 1979  was initially interpreted by the Supreme Court as not applicable to military personnel punished under common law, thus excluding sailors. The former insurgents got amnesty in legal disputes over years.

During the dictatorship, the Navy tried to avoid a new crisis by raising pay and improving the living conditions of its enlisted men. The demands of the sailors were eventually met. In the 21st century, conditions for non-commissioned officers are better and the institution is more open. Corporals, sailors and soldiers can marry and vote, although the Military Regulations still prevent them from running for office. The 1983 Disciplinary Regulations are little different from those of 1955.

Historiography
In the memory of the military, the revolt is remembered as the desecration of their values by the president, emphasizing the "disorder and indiscipline", the weakness of the government and the link to the communists. Journalist Elio Gaspari and historian Thomas Skidmore are close to this understanding. Some authors address only indiscipline, but Skidmore also describes the social demands of the sailors. Among the left, there are retrospective views that the revolt was a mistake, a provocation, and an attack on discipline. There is, on the left, an interpretation of the revolt, and especially Anselmo's, as a destabilization of the Goulart government, paying little attention to the AMFNB.

Accusations about agents provocateurs
In a statement to Moniz Bandeira, published in 1977 in the book O governo João Goulart: as lutas sociais no Brasil (1961-1964), he stated that Anselmo was an agent of the Central Intelligence Agency (CIA) infiltrated into the sailors' movement to create a pretext for a right-wing coup. The book adds that the work as a double agent during the dictatorship is evidence of work before the coup, and the CIA was linked to the CENIMAR and the Military Police of opposition governor Carlos Lacerda, who infiltrated agents, in sailor's uniform, to carry out mayhem. Anselmo is also cited as an undercover agent for the Navy.

In this line of reasoning, "History has already proven that there were undercover agents among the sailors", and thus, "The movement of the Association of Sailors and Marines of Brazil was, subsequently, quite discredited and seen as a 'black page' in the history of Brazil, according to the immediate memory of the events." This version prevails at the beginning of the 21st century.

However, for a "new batch of studies", the movement of the military subalterns was "misrepresented", "biasedly interpreted as being plotted by the CIA, without further investigation". According to authors contrary to this interpretation, there is no proof for Corseuil's accusations and this version disregards the activities of Anselmo, the other sailors, and the left; it uses the sailors, especially Anselmo, as a scapegoat for the coup; segregates them from the left and society; treats the revolt as the result of external interference, does not consider the movement's demands and reproduces the officers' contempt for their subordinates' capacity for autonomous action. Another source, without taking sides, points out that Anselmo's speech had repercussions because it was in line with what the sailors and leftist militants wanted. Corporal and "sailor-journalist" Pedro Viegas contests that Anselmo was an undercover agent. He notes how Anselmo was not the strongest name for the AMFNB presidency, and was only elected due to the withdrawal of three other more preferred candidates.

Name
There is confusion as to the designation of the episode. The military use the terms revolt, rebellion, revolution, mutiny, strike, and assembly. Other titles are mayhem, uprising, insurrection and revolt. Historians and participating sailors prefer revolt. A 2010 dissertation discusses the names rebellion, revolt, and mutiny, preferring rebellion for what occurred in the Metalworkers Union, and mutiny, for on the ships. The latter two were in military legislation, mutiny as a form of disobedience and revolt, involving weapons.

Notes

References

Sources
Books

 
 
 
 
 
 
 

Articles and papers

 
 
 
 
 
 
 
 
 
 
 
 
 
 
 
 
 

Newspapers

 
 
 

Conflicts in 1964
1964 in Brazil
Cold War military history of Brazil